Latiano is a railway station in Latiano, Italy. The station is located on the Taranto–Brindisi railway. The train services are operated by Trenitalia.

Train services
The station is served by the following service(s):

Local services (Treno regionale) Taranto - Francavilla Fontana - Brindisi

References

This article is based upon a translation of the Italian language version as at October 2014.

Railway stations in Apulia
Buildings and structures in the Province of Brindisi